The Tailteann Games or Aonach Tailteann was an Irish sporting and cultural festival held in the Irish Free State in 1924, 1928, and 1932. It was intended as a modern revival of the Tailteann Games held from legendary times until the Norman invasion of Ireland; as such it drew inspiration from the Modern Olympics revival of the Ancient Olympics.  Croke Park, the Dublin headquarters of the Gaelic Athletic Association, was the venue for the opening ceremony and many of the sports events, which were open to people of Irish birth or ancestry. The Tailteann Games were held shortly after the Summer Olympics, such that athletes participating in Paris 1924 and Amsterdam 1928 came to compete. Participants coming from England, Scotland, Wales, Canada, the USA, South Africa and Australia as well as Ireland. Chess competitions were held in conjunction with the Irish Chess Union as part of the Tailteann Games. There were also artistic competitions and industrial displays. The games became regarded as a Cumann na nGaedheal project, and when that party lost power to Fianna Fáil after the 1932 election there was no financial backing for further games.

Origins
This revival "meeting of the Irish race" was announced by Éamon de Valera in Dáil Éireann in 1921. The 1922 Irish Race Convention supported the plan for an "Irish Race Olympic". However, due to the Anglo-Irish War and Civil War it was not held until 1924. The meeting was launched to celebrate the independence of Ireland. The Hogan Stand was built and opened for the 1924 games.

A report to revive the games was debated in the Dáil in June 1922. Modern sports such as motorcycling and shooting were to be included, along with a parade of massed choirs. The possibility of out-doing the Olympic Games was mentioned: "We have got representations from America to the effect that it would be advisable to depart from the idea of confining the Tailteann games to the Irish race and seeing that they predated the Greek Olympic by a thousand years we should be justified in entering upon a more varied programme." The first games were held in August 1922, with JJ Walsh, Minister for Posts and Telegraphs, as chair and Catherine Gifford Wilson, BA as secretary to the organisation.

Symbols
Commemorative medals were struck for all three games, in gold, silver, silver gilt, and bronze. They depict Tailtiu, the patron deity of the ancient Tailteann Games, with inscription "An Bhainrioghan Tailte" ("Queen Tailte").

1924
The games opened with the "Tailteann choir" singing the "Tailteann ode", with words by Oliver St. John Gogarty and music by Louis O'Brien. The ode won Gogarty a bronze medal in the literature section of the 1924 Olympic art competition. The Irish flag was carried by Tom Kiely, winner of the 1904 Olympic all-around (decathlon) title.

To increase the quality of the competition, some Olympic stars without Irish heritage were invited to compete as guests.

The dissident Irish republican movement which had lost the Civil War urged a boycott of the games "falsely described as Aonach Tailteann", because it rejected the legitimacy of the Free State government which sponsored the games. Rugby union was excluded from the program because the Irish Rugby Football Union was seen as "undemocratic and almost un-Irish".

Billiards
Billiards events were held in the Catholic Club in O'Connell Street.

Clay Bird Shooting

Chess
Run in conjunction with the Irish Chess Union, there were three competitions, the overall competition was won by the reigning Irish Champion Philip Baker, the Major Competition was won by Lord Dunsany, with Aaron Sayers as runner-up. Dublin Chess Club provided its premises in Regent House, Trinity College Dublin as well as equipment for use for the Competitions.

Dancing

Golf (men and women)

The women's golf event was held at Portmarnock.
The Men's golf event may have been held at Dollymount.

Hurling
In hurling, teams from England, Wales, the United States, Scotland, and Ireland played.

A shinty–hurling match was played between Scotland team organised by the Camanachd Association and an Ireland team organised by the Gaelic Athletic Association (GAA).

The Camogie Association planned national and international camogie competitions, but withdrew after a dispute with the organisers, reflecting the anti-Free State bias of the association's leadership. An exhibition match was played without the association's sanction, while an association "Ireland" team played in London.

Handball
The handball events were played in Ballymun and Clondalkin.

Motor Cycling

Races took place in the Phoenix Park, Dublin.

Music
Musical events came in several types and were held in a number of venues. There were performances and competitions. Some performances including operas took place in The Theatre Royal. Some competitions such as band contests were held in Ballsbridge and some were in the Metropolitan Hall in Lower Abbey Street.

Rowing
The rowing events were held at the centre of rowing in Ireland, namely, Islandbridge on the River Liffey.

Swimming
Swimming events were held in the pond at Dublin Zoo. American Johnny Weissmuller and Australian Andrew "Boy" Charleton took part.

Athletics
Were held in Croke Park, Dublin. The American Harold Osborn, the 1924 Olympic high jump champion, won the same event in the Tailteann Games at Croke Park.

Sailing
The Sailing events of 1924 were sailed in Kingstown (now Dún Laoghaire) on Saturday in the second week of August.

Motor Boating
The Motor Boat event of 1924 took place in Dublin Bay in conjunction with the sailing regatta.
Match on declared speed, allowances conceded at start. First boat at 4.15 pm.
Shantax. winner.

Cultural programme

W. B. Yeats persuaded the Royal Irish Academy to award prizes. The gold medal went to Stephen MacKenna for his translation of Plotinus; other winners were Oliver Gogarty, Francis Stuart, and James Stephens. A banquet presided over by T. M. Healy, the Governor-General of the Irish Free State, had an "oddly assorted" group of guests invited by Yeats, including Augustus John, Sir Edwin Lutyens, writers Compton Mackenzie, G. K. Chesterton, Lennox Robinson, and Carlos Magalhães de Azeredo; cricketers Ranjitsinhji and C. B. Fry; and diplomats Willem Hubert Nolens and Erik Palmstierna. Chesterton accepted the medal on his behalf of the absent MacKenna, who later refused it.

An art and craft exhibition at the Royal Hibernian Academy displayed 1,597 works, more than half entered for competition in 32 categories. The overall "Tailteann Trophy" went to Seán Keating's Homage to Hugh Lane. Other gold medallists included Margaret Clarke, Francis Doyle Jones, Letitia Hamilton, Power O'Malley, and Patrick Tuohy.

At the Theatre Royal two recent operas by Irish composers were performed: Geoffrey Molyneux Palmer's Sruth na Maoile (1922) and Harold White's Seán the Post (1924), along with Shamus O'Brien (1896) by Charles V. Stanford. The last was not successful: "there seemed to be a greater number of people in the orchestra than in the audience".

In the genre painting competition, Charles Lamb won a silver medal for Dancing at a Northern Crossroads, depicting a traditional crossroads dance.

1928
The programme for the 1928 games included athletics, billiards, boxing, camogie, chess, cycling, Gaelic football, golf, gymnastics, Gaelic handball, hurling, motorcycling, rowing, and swimming.

At the awards ceremony in the Iveagh Gardens, the pageant The Coming of Fionn by Seamus MacCall was staged.

Chess
The 1928 Games was won by John O'Hanlon a multiple Irish Champion.

Rowing
Was held on the Lee in Cork.

Swimming
Took place in Blackrock baths

Motor Boating
The Motor Boat event of 1928 took place at Ballyglass, Co. Westmeath, home of the Lough Ree Yacht Club, and Motor Yacht Club of Ireland, on 16 August. Races took place in various classes:
Race 1. Free for all sweepstakes. 1st. 'Fiend' J.W. Shillan. 2nd. 'Irish Express' Major H. Waller. 3rd. 'Miss Chief' J. C. Healy.
Race 2. Handicap for boats with outboard engines not exceeding 350cc. Boat min. weight 120 lbs. 1st. 'Miss Chief' J.C. Healy. 2nd. 'Busy Bee' Lt. Col. Mansfield. 3rd. 'Imp' D. Tidmarsh.
Race 3. Handicap for boats with inboard engines exceeding 20'-0". 1st. 'Shrike' Lt. Col. Mansfield. 2nd.'La Vague' Dr. V. S. Delany. 3rd. 'Janet' J. C. Healy.
Race 4. Handicap for boats with outboard engines of unlimited cc. Boat min. weight 140 lbs. 1st. 'Baby Costume' L. Hogan. 2nd.'Fiend' J. W. Shillan. 3rd. 'Busy Bee' Lt. Col. Mansfield.
Race 5. Free for all scratch race. Outboard engines. 1st. 'Fiend' J. W. Shillan. 2nd. 'Miss Chief' J. C. Healy. 3rd. 'Busy Bee' Lt. Col. Mansfield.
Race 6. Handicap race for boats with inboard engines, length not exceeding 20 ft. 1st. 'Udra' Dr. V.S. Delany. 2nd. 'Mermaid' Mr. J. Ryan.

Sailing
Race 1. Yachts over 10 tons and under 40 tons. race of 24 miles.
'Mavourneen' F.S.J. Worrell

1932
With the 1932 Summer Olympics begin held in Los Angeles, the Tailteann Games was originally scheduled for 1931 to avoid a clash, but postponed to 1932, which meant Olympic athletes from Ireland or abroad could not be present. The Games' main backer, minister J. J. Walsh, lost office when Fianna Fáil took power after the 1932 election, and public funding was cut. Against a background of the Great Depression and the Anglo-Irish Trade War, the Games cut from two weeks to one; they made a £12 profit.

Cycling
The cycling event was won by J.P. Woodcock.

Chess
The third games was won again by John O'Hanlon who was also Irish Champion in 1932.

Gymnastics
These events were held in the Mansion House in Dublin.

Handball, National and International
Events were held in the Phoenix Park, Dublin.,ref>Sunday Independent, 5 Aug. 1928</ref>

Sailing
Held in Dublin Bay on 14 August 1928.
Event 1. yachts over 10 tons and under 40 tons.

1932
The change of Irish Government left the Tailteann games without government support, and as a result there were very few competitions.

Sailing
The sailing events were hosted by the National Yacht Club, Dun Laoghaire in July 1932.

1937
In 1937 Éamon de Valera organised an inter-departmental committee into the feasibility of staging another games, which reported in June that it would be possible to stage one in 1939. De Valera used the split in Irish athletics governance as an excuse to defer consideration, to the chagrin of J. J. Walsh. The onset of the Second World War deferred any progress and nothing further happened after the war.

References

Sources

External links
 Tailteann Games index of Pathé newsreel clips
 Tailteann Games, digitised photographs from the Irish Independent at the National Library of Ireland

1924 in Irish sport
1928 in Irish sport
1932 in Irish sport
1924 establishments in Ireland
Recurring sporting events established in 1924
1932 disestablishments in Ireland
Recurring sporting events disestablished in 1932
Gaelic Athletic Association competitions
Multi-sport events in Ireland
Sports festivals in Ireland
Irish diaspora
Arts festivals in the Republic of Ireland
Celtic festivals
Celtic Revival
Festivals established in 1924
Defunct festivals
1924 in multi-sport events
1928 in multi-sport events
1932 in multi-sport events